Dacryobolus gracilis is a species of crust fungus in the family Fomitopsidaceae. This brown rot fungus was described as new to science in 2016 by Hai-Sheng Yuan. It has a fragile, waxy fruit body with small, slender spines. The fungus has been found in Chongqing and Guangxi, in southwestern China.

References

Fomitopsidaceae
Fungi described in 2016
Fungi of China